William of Merton was the Dean of Wells during 1237.

References

Deans of Wells